Erik A. Eriksson  (born 1969) is a Swedish politician. He is a member of the Centre Party. He has been a member of the Parliament of Sweden since 2006.

References

Members of the Riksdag from the Centre Party (Sweden)
1969 births
Living people
Members of the Andra kammaren
21st-century Swedish politicians